20th Century Masters - The Millennium Collection - The Best of Jackyl is a compilation album by American heavy-metal band Jackyl. It was released in March 2003 under Geffen Records.

Track listing

References 

2003 greatest hits albums
Jackyl albums
Geffen Records compilation albums
Jackyl